Bhim Raj (1943-1994) was an Indian politician. He was a Member of Parliament, representing Rajasthan in the Rajya Sabha the upper house of India's Parliament as a member of the Indian National Congress.

References

Rajya Sabha members from Rajasthan
Indian National Congress politicians
1943 births
1994 deaths